Clemensia centralis is a moth of the family Erebidae first described by George Hampson in 1900. It is found in Guatemala and Panama.

References

Cisthenina
Moths described in 1900